Ceremony for the 25th Hong Kong Film Awards was held on 8 April 2006 in the Hong Kong Coliseum and hosted by Eric Tsang, Teresa Mo and Chapman To. Twenty-five winners in nineteen categories were unveiled, with film Election being the year's biggest winner.

Awards
Winners are listed first, highlighted in boldface, and indicated with a double dagger.

References

25th Hong Kong Film Awards in culture 
The 25th Hong Kong Film Awards ceremony was modeled in a film My Name Is Fame (2006) with Faye Ng (played by Huo Siyan) as an announcer for the Best Supporting Actor category and Poon Ka-fai (by Lau Ching-wan) as one of its nominees. Lau Ching-wan won the Best (Leading) Actor category at the 26th Hong Kong Film Awards (the next year) for this exact role.

External links
 Official website of the Hong Kong Film Awards

2006
2005 film awards
2006 in Hong Kong
Hong